Stanisław Michał Pawlak (born 27 September 1933, Kalisz) is a Polish international law scholar and diplomat, ambassador of Poland to Canada (1978–1983), Syria (1996–2001), permanent representative to the United Nations (1989–1991), and judge of the International Tribunal for the Law of the Sea (since 2005).

Education and scientific career 
Stanisław Pawlak grew up in Kalisz where he finished high school. In 1955, he graduated from law at the University of Warsaw. In 1967, he received doctoral degree, and in 1973, postdoctoral degree (habilitation). In 2002, he became full professor.

In 1974, he became a lecturer at the Institute of International Relations, University of Warsaw; since 2013, as emeritus. Visiting professor to several universities in the United States, Canada and Syria. Professor and Dean of the Faculty of Social Science and Administration at the Warsaw Academy of Computer Science and Administration (2005–2018). He has been specializing on international public law, international terrorism, protection of ethnic minorities in Europe, disarmament, international relations in Far East.

Public career 
Between 1955 and 2005 Pawlak was working for the Ministry of Foreign Affairs. He was member of Polish component of the Neutral Nations Supervisory Commission in Panmunjom, Korea (1956–1958), Attaché and Second Secretary at the embassy in Tokyo, Japan (1958–1963), deputy chief of the Polish delegation to the International Control Commission, Saigon, Vietnam (1965–1966); First Secretary at the embassy in Washington, the United States of America (1967–1970). From 1978 to 1983 Pawlak served as ambassador to Canada, from 1989 to 1991 he was permanent representative to the United Nations in New York. He was also ambassador to Syrian Arab Republic, additionally accredited to Hashemite Kingdom of Jordan (1996–2001). He was Polish Representative to the UN General Assembly (1973–1978, 1983–1990, 2002–2005), the Steering Committee for Human Rights, Council of Europe (1992–1995), as well. At the Ministry he was holding several important posts, e.g. deputy director of Minister's Office (1973–1975), director of the Department of International Organizations (1975–1978, 1986–1989), director of the Legal and Treaty Department (1983–1986). He headed several delegations: on delimiting Polish maritime boundary with East Germany or Soviet Union, among others. From 2001 to 2005 he was foreign policy advisor to the president Aleksander Kwaśniewski. Since 2002 Titular Ambassador.

He has been member of the Union of Polish Youth (1948–1955) and of the Polish United Workers' Party (1952–1990), the International Law Commission (1987–1991), Polish Legislative Council (1983–1989), Polish Institute of International Affairs Council (1983–1989), Commission on Law of the Sea, Polish Academy of Sciences.

On 1 October 2005 he became judge of the International Tribunal for the Law of the Sea. In 2014, he was chosen for another 9-year term. Since October 2017 President of the Chamber for Marine Environment Disputes Among cases he ruled was Philippines v. China (2016).

Honours 

 Order of the Rising Sun, 3rd Class, Gold Rays with Neck Ribbon, Japan (2021)
Commandor of the Order of Polonia Restituta, Poland (2005)
 Officer of the Order of Polonia Restituta, Poland (1985)
 Gold Cross of Merit, Poland (1974)

Selected works 

 Okinawa, wyd. MON, Warszawa: Wydawnictwo MON, 1972, .
 Polityka Stanów Zjednoczonych wobec Chin 1941–1955, Warszawa: PWN, 1973, .
 Polityka Stanów Zjednoczonych wobec Chin 1956–1978, Warszawa: PWN, 1982, .
 Ochrona mniejszości narodowych w Europie, Warszawa: SCHOLAR, 2001, .
 Publikacje i dokumenty z lat 1962–2012 : (wybór), Warszawa: Sowa, 2013, .

References 

1933 births
Ambassadors of Poland to Canada
Ambassadors of Poland to Syria
Commanders of the Order of Polonia Restituta
International law scholars
Living people
Officers of the Order of Polonia Restituta
People from Kalisz
Polish judges of United Nations courts and tribunals
Polish United Workers' Party members
Permanent Representatives of Poland to the United Nations
Recipients of the Gold Cross of Merit (Poland)
Recipients of the Order of the Rising Sun, 3rd class
University of Warsaw alumni
Academic staff of the University of Warsaw
Members of the International Law Commission